Rick Malambri (born November 7, 1982) is an American actor, dancer, and model. He is best known for starring in Step Up 3D, released in theaters on August 6, 2010.

Early life 
Malambri was born in Fort Walton Beach, Florida, to Jeannie Marie (née Egleston) and Timothy Michael Malambri. Malambri began his career as a model, having been featured in Abercrombie and Fitch ads in 2004.

Career 
In 2007, Malambri started his acting career by guest starring in shows such as How I Met Your Mother, Criminal Minds, and Party Down. Later that year, he played the role of Lt. Ash in the military science fiction film Universal Soldiers.

In 2010, Malambri landed lead role of Luke in 3D dance film Step Up 3D alongside Sharni Vinson, directed by Jon M. Chu. He also starred as Will Dutton in Hallmark Channel movie After The Fall alongside Andrea Bowen. In 2011, he played the recurring role of Eduardo, a choreographer who becomes romantically involved with one of his students, in the ABC Family's The Lying Game.  He had minor roles in Clear History and Surrogates.

He starred as Duncan in family comedy movie A Holiday Heist alongside Lacey Chabert and Vivica A. Fox. In 2014, Malambri starred as Joey D'Amico in the PixL TV movie The Cookie Mobster alongside Pippa Black and Mackenzie Foy. In 2016, he starred as Andy in the PixL TV movie Change of Heart alongside Leah Pipes. In 2018, he guest starred in an episode of TNT's Animal Kingdom. In 2021, Malambri starred as Mark in the Lifetime original movie Lethal Love Letter.

Personal life 
Malambri married model and actress Lisa Mae in 2010. They had a daughter, Alyx, in 2013.

Filmography

Film

Television

video games

Music Video Appearances 
..

References

External links
 
 
 
 Rick Malambri at the Movieweb

1982 births
Male actors from Florida
American male dancers
American male film actors
Male models from Florida
American male television actors
Living people
Choctawhatchee High School alumni
21st-century American male actors
People from Fort Walton Beach, Florida